Disco Dan may refer to:

 Darnell Glenn Ford or Dan Ford (born 1952), American former professional baseball player
 Cool "Disco" Dan (1969–2017), pseudonym of American graffiti artist Dan Hogg
 Disco Dan (video game), a 1984 ZX Spectrum game originally released by Gem Software, later reissued by Amstrad under the Sinclair brand
 Dan Bylsma (born 1970), American professional ice hockey coach, sometimes called "Disco Dan" as an inside joke